PAPR may refer to:

 Peak-to-average power ratio, the peak divided by the root mean square (RMS) of the waveform
 Power Architecture Platform Reference
Powered air-purifying respirator
 Prospect Creek Airport (ICAO location indicator: PAPR), in Prospect Creek, Alaska, United States
 papR (Bt), a component of quorum sensing in Bacillus thuringiensis